Angela Adamoli (born 15 June 1972 in Livorno) is a former Italian basketball player.

References

1972 births
Living people
Italian women's basketball players
Sportspeople from Livorno